Ciudad Lerdo (Lerdo City) is a small city in the northeastern portion of the Mexican state of Durango.  It serves as the municipal seat for the surrounding municipality of the same name.

It is located at co-ordinates 25.33° N, 103.31° W, bordering southeastern Coahuila. As of 2010, the city of Lerdo had a population of 79,669, up from 71,373 people as of 2005. Lerdo Municipality had a population of 141,043. The municipality has an area of 1,868.8 km² (721.5 sq mi). It is part of a greater metropolitan area that includes Torreón Municipality and Matamoros Municipality in Coahuila, as well as Gómez Palacio Municipality in Durango.

The city is lush with vegetation, but has an arid climate. Ciudad Lerdo is known for its parks, gardens, and ice cream made with fresh milk from local dairies.

Notable people
Dario Alvarado-Torres, U.S. Political Candidate in Oklahoma 2014–Present
Nestor Mesta Chayres, "El Gitano de México" - lyric opera tenor and bolero vocalist on the international concert stage.
Francisco Sarabia, first pilot who flew non-stop from Mexico City to New York in 1939.
Jesús López Luevanos, governor from 1940-1944, notable for uniting all three cities in the Laguna. 
Pepe Jaramillo, renowned pianist of the 1950s, 1960s, and 1970s.
Luis Ramírez Castruita, baker and designer, known by no one. He has the particular ability of telling useless and doubtful stories compulsively. 1980–Present.
Sonia Sandoval Famous purchaser and dancer

Sister cities

Ciudad Lerdo has one sister city, as designated by Sister Cities International:
 Las Cruces, New Mexico, United States

References

Link to tables of population data from Census of 2005 INEGI: Instituto Nacional de Estadística, Geografía e Informática
Durango Enciclopedia de los Municipios de México

External links
Ayuntamiento de Lerdo Official website

Populated places in Durango